Mihail M. Priboianu (also known as Bubi Priboianu; January 26, 1892—after 1955) was a Romanian engineer.

Born in Bucharest, where he attended high school, Priboianu graduated from the Paris School of Mines and became an engineer. In 1929, he entered the Higher Mine Council, and also belonged to the Higher Technical Council in the Ministry of Public Works. A member of the Peasants' Party and later of the National Peasants' Party, he was president of the latter organization's Durostor County chapter. Between 1929 and 1930, during the government of Iuliu Maniu, he served as Prefect of Argeș County; in 1930–1931, and again in 1932–1933, he represented the same area in the Assembly of Deputies. He took charge of the official response to the 1930 Costești wooden church fire, organizing humanitarian aid, burial of the victims, visits by dignitaries and coordination with the Romanian Orthodox Church, the army and the prosecutorial service. In 1940, from July 4 to September 4, he served as Minister of Army Procurement in the government of Ion Gigurtu.

Priboianu owned significant urban properties as well as land, part of which was expropriated during the 1945 land reform. Arrested by the communist regime in May 1950, he was sent to Sighet Prison, where he was incarcerated until July 1955. He was then taken to the Malmaison barracks for questioning before being obliged to live on the Bărăgan Plain.

Notes

1892 births
Year of death unknown
Politicians from Bucharest
Mines Paris - PSL alumni
Engineers from Bucharest
Prefects of Romania
National Peasants' Party politicians
20th-century Romanian politicians
Members of the Chamber of Deputies (Romania)
Members of the Romanian Cabinet
People detained by the Securitate
Inmates of Sighet prison
Romanian prisoners and detainees